Charlie Pickering (born 29 August 1977) is an Australian comedian, television and radio presenter, author and producer.  

Pickering currently hosts The Weekly with Charlie Pickering, a weekly news satire television show on the ABC, as well as its yearly spin-off special The Yearly with Charlie Pickering, co-host of Tomorrow Tonight with Annabel Crabb and Adam Liaw and Breakfast on ABC Radio Melbourne on Friday.  

He is known as a former co-host on the current affairs program The Project, and regularly appeared on the game show Talkin' 'Bout Your Generation as the "Generation X" team captain.

Career

Early career
After leaving his job as a lawyer, Pickering appeared in the Melbourne International Comedy Festival (MICF) in 2002 with Michael Chamberlin in Boiling Point, a show which earned them the Piece of Wood Award.  Prior to this, Pickering had appeared with the sketch comedy group Enter the Datsun in the MICF in 1998, 1999 and 2002. In 2003, Pickering and Chamberlin teamed up again in Boiling Point 2, the pair also appearing the same year with fellow comedian Terri Psiakis in Equal Third. In 2004, he appeared in Revolver. In 2005, Pickering launched Betterman at the MICF, a show he went on to tour in New Zealand where he won the Best International Act in the New Zealand Comedy Guild Awards, and also at the Edinburgh Fringe Festival where he was nominated for the Perrier Award's Best Newcomer. In 2006 he presented his show Auto at the Melbourne International Comedy Festival, receiving a nomination for the Barry Award.
For the April 2013 Melbourne International Comedy festival, he co-hosted with Waleed Aly a series of shows titled The World's Problems Solved.

Television
In 2008, Pickering co-hosted a show with Michael Chamberlin on The Comedy Channel called The Mansion. The series ran for 13 episodes. Pickering hosted season 3 of Channel V's travelling game show, Cash Cab. From 2009 to 2012, he was a team captain on Network Ten's quiz show Talkin' 'Bout Your Generation, representing Generation X.

In July 2009, he became a co-host on Network Ten's infotainment program, The Project (originally The 7PM Project), with Carrie Bickmore and Dave Hughes. On 12 March 2014, Pickering announced that he was leaving The Project to "find new challenges", and in April 2015  he started hosting a weekly comedy/news satire program on ABC entitled The Weekly with Charlie Pickering.  In 2018, Charlie hosted Tomorrow Tonight on the ABC with Annabel Crabb.

Other television appearances include Rove Live, The Glass House, Today, Stand Up! (ABC), The 2006 Melbourne International Comedy Festival Gala (Network Ten), @Seven, The Project, Hughesy, We Have a Problem, Show Me the Movie!, Celebrity Name Game and Would I Lie to You? Australia.

Radio
Pickering has also worked in Australian radio, including youth radio station Triple J from 2001 to 2003. He has been a pundit on Fighting Talk on BBC Radio 5 Live in 2006 and 2007.

In December 2022, ABC announced that Pickering will host Breakfast on ABC Radio Melbourne on Friday from 2023.

Literature
Pickering published his first book, Impractical Jokes, in 2010.

Personal life

Pickering was born in Melbourne and educated at St Leonard's College, Brighton Grammar School and Monash University where he graduated with Bachelor of Arts (American History) and Bachelor of Laws degrees. 

Pickering is married to Sarah Krasnostein and they have one child. He converted to Judaism in 2013.

Political views

As co-host of Channel Ten's The Project, Pickering claimed to have voted Liberal "once". Pickering has hosted the ABC political and cultural commentary program The Weekly with Charlie Pickering since 2015. New Matilda describes the program as "a satirical news program with a progressive bent". On the program, Pickering has used his editorials to support halal certification and gay marriage, and to speak out against the detention of asylum seekers. He has been a strong critic of the Catholic Church. In June 2018 he angrily denounced the Catholic seal of the confessional. In March 2019, he denounced and ridiculed people who questioned the guilt of Cardinal George Pell in a segment of his program he called "The Pedo Files". Pell was subsequently found not guilty by a unanimous finding of the High Court of Australia.

Bibliography
Pickering, Charlie.  Impractical Jokes, Sydney:  Allen & Unwin, 2010

References

External links 
 
 

1977 births
People educated at Brighton Grammar School
Australian Jews
Australian stand-up comedians
Converts to Judaism
Living people
Triple J announcers
Talkin' 'Bout Your Generation
Australian television talk show hosts
Monash Law School alumni